Akash - New generation (IAST: Ākāśa "Sky") abbreviated as Akash-NG is a medium-range mobile surface-to-air missile defense system developed by the Defence Research and Development Organisation (DRDO) and produced by Bharat Dynamics Limited and Bharat Electronics. Private sector firm Electropneumatics and Hydraulics India is involved in Development cum Production Partner programme.

This missile is a successor to the Akash and Akash-1S series of missiles with improvements such as a Dual-pulse solid rocket motor, a canisterised launcher and an AESA Multifunction targeting radar to improve its probability of kill with a smaller ground operations and logistics footprint.

The missile uses an Ku-band Active radar seeker which was revealed to the public during Aero India 2021.

Development & Description 

Akash-NG will have an improved reaction time and higher level of protection against saturation attacks. The second stage uses dual-pulse solid rocket motor which is lighter compare to air-breathing ramjet engine present in the earlier Akash and Akash-1S missiles. It helps in reducing the weight and footprint of the platform. An active electronically scanned array Multi-Function Radar (MFR) improves the effectiveness of the missile against targets with low radar cross-section whereas optical proximity fuze provides excellent anti-electromagnetic interference capability. 

As per Electropneumatics and Hydraulics India, Akash NG has  range of 70 km and can operate upto an elevation of 20° to 70° with an azimuth of 360°. Two canister missile stacks take 10 minutes to reload. From target acquisition by command-and-control unit, the system can fire one missile within 10 seconds and in 20 seconds a salvo of three missiles can be fired. The deployment time is less than 20 minutes between transportation and ready-to-fire mode.

Testing
Maiden Test : Defence Research and Development Organisation successfully conducted the first test of the missile on 25 January 2021 from Launching Complex - III at the Integrated Test Range near Chandipur, Odisha at about 2:30 pm against an electronic target.
2nd Test : Defence Research and Development Organisation and Indian Air Force successfully conducted the 2nd test of the missile on 21 July 2021 from Launching Complex - III at the Integrated Test Range near Chandipur, Odisha at about 12:45 PM against an electronic target.
3rd Test : Defence Research and Development Organisation  has successfully test-fired the Akash-NG surface-to-air missile air defence system off the coast of Odisha in Balasore at 11:45am IST on 23rd July, 2021. The test was carried out amidst inclement weather conditions proving the all-weather capability of the weapon system. The flight test has validated the functioning of complete weapon system consisting of the missile with indigenously developed RF Seeker, Launcher, Multi-Function Radar and Command, Control & Communication system. 
4th Test :  Successful test firing at Pokhran on 26th April 2022

Operators

 Indian Army — Planned
 Indian Air Force — Planned

See also

Akash
Type 3 Chū-SAM
KS-1
NASAMS
Barak 8
QRSAM
VL-SRSAM
Advanced Air Defence (AAD)
Prithvi Air Defence (PAD)
XRSAM

References

Surface-to-air missiles of India
Post–Cold War weapons of India
Defence Research and Development Organisation
Jannes.com